Joseph John "Joe" Arlauckas (born July 20, 1965) is an American former professional basketball player of Lithuanian descent. During his playing career, he played at the power forward position. In 2018, Arlauckas was named to the 101 Greats of European Basketball list.

Arlauckas is well-known for holding the record for the most points scored in a modern-era single EuroLeague game, including only games played since the 1991–92 season. He scored 63 points in a FIBA European League (EuroLeague) game, while playing with the Spanish club Real Madrid, in a game against the Italian club Virtus Bologna. The game took place during the 1995–96 season, and occurred on February 26, 1996. Radivoj Korać holds the overall all-time EuroLeague (FIBA European Champions Cup) single-game scoring record, at 99 points scored, counting all games played since the competition began during the 1958 season.

Early years
Arlauckas was born on July 20, 1965, in Rochester, New York. He was born to an immigrant father from Lithuania, and to an Italian American mother. Arlauckas attended Thomas Jefferson High School, in Rochester, where he played high school basketball.

College career
Arlauckas played four years of college basketball in the NCAA Division I, at Niagara University, with the Purple Eagles. He attended school and played there from 1983 to 1987.

Professional career

NBA career
Arlauckas was drafted with the 74th pick of the 1987 NBA draft by the Sacramento Kings, along with their first round draft pick Kenny Smith. In his first season in the NBA, the Kings had a poor regular season record of 24–58 (6th place of the Midwest Division), which started with Hall-of-Famer Bill Russell's brief stint as the Kings' head coach (during which time the Kings had a record of 17–41).

During his sole season in the National Basketball Association, Arlauckas appeared in nine games, averaging four points per game, in roughly 10 minutes of play per game.

Europe
On December 14, 1987, Arlauckas was cut by the NBA's Kings. He then went to Italy, where he played for 6 months of time in the Italian top-tier level LBA with Snaidero Caserta. He went on to have a highly successful career playing in Spain (one exact decade), playing in the Spanish top-tier level ACB League.

In Spain, he played with Caja de Ronda, Taugrés, and Real Madrid, winning several individual and team accolades; with the latter, he formed one of European basketball's most fearsome front courts, along with center Arvydas Sabonis, and he notably won the championship of the top-tier level European league, the FIBA European League (EuroLeague), with Real Madrid, in 1995, against Olympiacos. With Real Madrid, he also won the 2nd-tier level European league, the FIBA EuroCup (FIBA Saporta Cup), during the 1996–97 season.

On February 26, 1996, Arlauckas scored 63 points, a record in the modern era of the EuroLeague, against Kinder Bologna in Italy. Real Madrid won the game, by a score of 115–96. In six seasons out of ten played in Spain, Arlauckas averaged more than 20 points per game. He scored 7,543 points in the Liga ACB, for a scoring average of 20.7 points per game.

He retired in 2000, at the age of 35, after playing two years in Greece – playing one season apiece with the Greek top-tier level Basket League clubs AEK Athens and Aris Thessaloniki.

Post-playing career
After he retired from playing basketball, Arlauckas became a sports commentator, working for EuroLeague TV.

Honours and awards
Italian Cup winner: 1988
4× Spanish League All-Star: 1990, 1992, 1993, 1995
Spanish Cup winner: 1993
Spanish Cup MVP: 1993
Spanish League champion: 1993–94
FIBA European League (EuroLeague) champion: 1994–95
FIBA European League (EuroLeague) Top Scorer: 1995–96
FIBA EuroCup (FIBA Saporta Cup) champion: 1996–97
Greek League All-Star: 1998
101 Greats of European Basketball: (2018)

References

External links

 Real Madrid archives 
 "The czar's best partner"
 Joe Arlauckas, the "recordman"
 FIBA Europe Profile
 Italian League Profile 
 Spanish League Profile 
 Greek Basket League Profile 

1965 births
Living people
AEK B.C. players
American expatriate basketball people in Greece
American expatriate basketball people in Italy
American expatriate basketball people in Spain
American men's basketball players
American people of Lithuanian descent
Aris B.C. players
Baloncesto Málaga players
Basketball players from New York (state)
Juvecaserta Basket players
Liga ACB players
Niagara Purple Eagles men's basketball players
Power forwards (basketball)
Real Madrid Baloncesto players
Sacramento Kings draft picks
Sacramento Kings players
Saski Baskonia players
Sportspeople from Rochester, New York